Ellena Perry (born 12 April 1997, Welwyn Garden City) is an English rugby union player. She represents England women's national rugby union team internationally and plays for Gloucester-Hartpury Women domestically.

Early and personal life
Perry was born in Welwyn Garden City in 1997. Her mother Jan and father Paul used to take her to play at Hertford RFC from the age of 6. Perry attended The John Warner School and won the School Games in 2015 with the south east sevens rugby team.

She completed A-levels in physical education, psychology, business studies and biology at Hartpury College before studying sports science at the University of Coventry.

Club career 
Perry made her Saracens Women debut in 2015, a week after tuning 18 and was still 18 when she played in the 2016 Premiership final for Saracens. In 2019 Perry switched to Gloucester-Hartpury Women, just before the start of the 2019-20 Premier 15s season.

International career 
Perry made her England debut as a loose head prop in 2018, during the 2018 Quilter Internationals. She played in all three games.

In December 2020, she was called up to the England squad to play against France, a game that England won 25-23. She missed several fixtures in 2019-2020 due to injury.

In 2021 she was named an invitational player for England in the 2021 Women's Six Nations Championship.

References

1997 births
Living people
England women's international rugby union players
Rugby union players from Welwyn Garden City
English female rugby union players